Richard Brousek (12 January 1931 – 28 November 2015) was an Austrian football forward who played for Austria. He also played for SC Wacker Wien , Sportclub Enschede and Be Quick 1887.

References

External links

 
 

1931 births
2015 deaths
Austrian footballers
Austria international footballers 
Association football forwards
Sportclub Enschede players
FC Admira Wacker Mödling players